Oster is an unincorporated community in Carver and Wright Counties, Minnesota, United States.

The community is located along County Road 133 (CR 133) near 118th Street SW.  16th Street is also in the immediate area.  Nearby places include Waverly, Mayer, New Germany, Winsted, Montrose, and Watertown.

Oster is located within Hollywood Township in Carver County; and also located within Woodland Township in Wright County.

References

Unincorporated communities in Carver County, Minnesota
Unincorporated communities in Wright County, Minnesota
Unincorporated communities in Minnesota